Jarring Effects is a French musical label based in Lyon, south-east of France. Jarring Effects encourages musicians to be independent, produce the music themselves, be creative and to make music they enjoy rather than trying to make it commercially viable. It was created on an associative basis and remains an association.

Jarring Effects is often associated with High Tone and Ez3kiel, electro-dub bands from France, but a lot of underground audio-activists have had albums or songs released on the label. Jarring Effects Label is a cooperative since 2007.

Bands
 High Tone
 La Phaze
 Interlope
 Meï Teï Shô
 L'Œuf raide
 Monsieur orange
 Ez3kiel
 Reverse Engineering
 Twelve
 R-zatz
 Fumuj
 Playdoe
 Brigadier JC
 B r oad way
 Revo
 Grosso Gadgetto
 Von Magnet
 Vuneny
 Idem
 Ben Sharpa
 Sibot
 Cape Town Beats
 Oddateee

See also
 List of record labels

External links
 Jarring Effects web site

References 

French record labels
Electronic music record labels